Thorybopus is a genus of sea slugs, specifically dorid nudibranchs. They are marine gastropod molluscs in the family Discodorididae.

Species
Species so far described in this genus include:

Thorybopus lophatus Bouchet, 1977

References

Discodorididae